Transtek Systems is an enterprise software development company Based in Abu Dhabi, United Arab Emirates. The company was founded in 2000 and has since been supporting medium and large companies within the MENA region through a range of software solutions.

History of Transtek 
Transtek Systems was founded in 2000 by Abdul Salam Haykal and Mohammad Haykal. On 1 February 2021 Hussam Khaskieh was appointed as CEO of the company.

Software produced by Transtek Systems 
Transtek multidisciplinary software for a variety of different fields and industries. The company is known for the Mojodat family of software.

Transtek has developed the following software services:

 Mojodat Fixed Assets

 Mojodat Maintenance

 Mojodat Inventory

 Compass HR

 Hala Peak

 Estejaba

ERP software companies
Software companies established in 2000